The Night Club Lady is a 1932 American pre-Code mystery film directed by Irving Cummings and starring Adolphe Menjou, Mayo Methot and Richard 'Skeets' Gallagher. It was followed by a sequel The Circus Queen Murder in 1933 with Menjou reprising his role. A third, unrelated film featuring Thatcher Colt, The Panther's Claw, was released in 1942.

Cast
 Adolphe Menjou as Police Commissioner Thatcher Colt  
 Mayo Methot as Lola Carewe  
 Richard 'Skeets' Gallagher as Tony  
 Ruthelma Stevens as Miss Kelly  
 Blanche Friderici as Mrs. Carewe  
 Nat Pendleton as Mike McDougal  
 Albert Conti as Vincent Rowland  
 Greta Granstedt as Eunice Tahon 
 Ed Brady as Bill  
 Frank Darien as Dr. Magnus 
 Gerald Fielding as Guy Everett 
 George Humbert as Andre  
 Olaf Hytten as Walter - Colt's Butler 
 Lee Phelps as Joe 
 Teru Shimada as Ito Mura  
 Wilhelm von Brincken as Dr. Emil Lengle  
 Niles Welch as Dr. Baldwin

References

Bibliography
 Backer, Ron. Mystery Movie Series of 1930s Hollywood. McFarland, 2012.

External links
 

1932 films
1932 mystery films
1930s English-language films
American mystery films
Films directed by Irving Cummings
Columbia Pictures films
American black-and-white films
1930s American films